Portrait of the Artist Holding a Thistle (or Eryngium) is an oil painting on parchment pasted on canvas by German artist Albrecht Dürer. Painted in 1493, it is the earliest of Dürer's painted self-portraits and has been identified as one of the first self-portraits painted by a Northern artist. It was acquired in 1922 by the Louvre in Paris.

Dürer looks out at the viewer with a psychologically complex but rather melancholy and reserved, serious minded, facial expression. During the 15th century, thistles  were symbols of male conjugal fidelity.

History
In 1493, Dürer was 22 years old and working in Strasbourg. He had completed his apprenticeship with Michael Wolgemut and his tour as a journeyman, and would marry Agnes Frey on 7 July 1494.

The date and the plant in the artist's hand seem to suggest that this is a betrothal portrait (Brautporträt). Dürer has in fact depicted himself in the act of offering a flowering spray identified by botanists as Eryngium amethystinum: its German name is "Mannestreue", meaning conjugal fidelity. Resembling the thistle (from which the portrait's title), this umbelliferous plant is used in medicine, and is regarded as an aphrodisiac. It may also have religious significance; the same plant in outline form is inscribed in the gold ground of  Dürer's painting Christ as the Man of Sorrows (1493–94).

Dürer was temperamentally inclined to philosophical doubts. He often analysed his own face in drawn or painted effigies – sometimes idealizing it, sometimes not. The lines written beside the date in this painting reveal the philosophical and Christian intention of the work:
Myj sach die gatAls es oben schtat.

In other words (and liberally): My affairs follow the course allotted to them on high. Marriage has in part determined his destiny – the Bridegroom puts his future life in the hands of God.

In 1805, Goethe saw a copy of this portrait in the museum at Leipzig and described it as of "inestimable value." According to Lawrence Gowing, who calls this "the most French of all his pictures", the Portrait of the Artist Holding a Thistle is singular among Dürer's paintings as "the touch is freer and color more iridescent than in any other picture one remembers".

References

Sources

 Brion, Marcel. Dürer. London: Thames and Hudson, 1960.
 Gowing, Lawrence. Paintings in the Louvre. New York: Stewart, Tabori & Chang, 1987. 
 Wolf, Norbert. Albrecht Dürer. Prestel, 2010.

Further reading

 Bailey, Martin. Dürer. London: Phaidon Press, 1995. 
 Bartrum, Giulia. Albrecht Dürer and his Legacy. British Museum Press, 2002. 
 Campbell Hutchison, Jane. Albrecht Dürer: A Biography. Princeton University Press, 1990. 
 Eser, Thomas. "Dürers Selbstbildnisse als 'Probstücke'. Eine pragmatische Deutung". In: Menschenbilder. Beiträge zur Altdeutschen Kunst, ed. by Andreas Tacke and Stefan Heinz, Petersberg 2011, p. 159–176
 Panofsky, Erwin. "The Life and Art of Albrecht Dürer", Princeton, 1945. 
 Schauerte, Thomas. "Dürer. Das ferne Genie. Eine Biografie". Stuttgart: Reclam, 2012.
 Schmidt, Sebastian: "„dan sӳ machten dy vürtrefflichen künstner reich“. Zur ursprünglichen Bestimmung von Albrecht Dürers Selbstbildnis im Pelzrock". In: Anzeiger des Germanischen Nationalmuseums 2010, p. 65–82.

External links

Dürer's Self-Portrait at the Louvre
Catholic Encyclopedia: Dürer
The Strange World of Albrecht Dürer at the Sterling and Francine Clark Art Institute. November 14, 2010 – March 13, 2011 (Dead link)

1493 paintings
Paintings in the Louvre by Dutch, Flemish and German artists
Artist
Self-portraits by Albrecht Dürer